Nikola Dimitrov Kovachev (Blagoevgrad, 4 June 1934 – Sofia, 26 November 2009) was a Bulgarian football player and manager.

Kovachev played for Bulgaria at the 1956 and 1960 Summer Olympics. He coached Hebar Pazardzhik and CSKA Sofia.

Honours

International
Bulgaria
Olympic Bronze Medal: 1956

References 

1934 births
2009 deaths
Bulgarian footballers
Bulgaria international footballers
Bulgarian football managers
Botev Plovdiv players
PFC CSKA Sofia players
1962 FIFA World Cup players
Footballers at the 1952 Summer Olympics
Footballers at the 1956 Summer Olympics
Footballers at the 1960 Summer Olympics
Olympic footballers of Bulgaria
Olympic bronze medalists for Bulgaria
Sportspeople from Blagoevgrad
Olympic medalists in football
First Professional Football League (Bulgaria) players
Macedonian Bulgarians
PFC CSKA Sofia managers
PFC Hebar Pazardzhik managers
Association football defenders
Medalists at the 1956 Summer Olympics